The 1992 New York City Marathon was the 23rd running of the annual marathon race in New York City, United States, which took place on Sunday, November 1. The men's elite race was won by South Africa's Willie Mtolo in a time of 2:09:29 hours while the women's race was won by Australia's Lisa Ondieki in 2:24:40.

A total of 27,797 runners finished the race, 22,536 men and 5441 women.

Results

Men

Women

  Gordon Bakoulis originally finished in sixth place with a time of 2:33:26, but was subsequently disqualified after failing a drug test for Probenecid, a substance banned as a masking agent. Bakoulis successfully appealed a four-year doping ban on the grounds she had taken the substance to treat Lyme disease, but the result remained annulled.

References

Results
Results. Association of Road Racing Statisticians. Retrieved 2020-05-23.

External links
New York Road Runners website

1992
New York City
Marathon
New York City Marathon